The 1900 United States presidential election in Alabama took place on November 6, 1900. All contemporary 45 states were part of the 1900 United States presidential election. Alabama voters chose eleven electors to the Electoral College, which selected the president and vice president.

Alabama was won by the Democratic nominees, former U.S. Representative William Jennings Bryan of Nebraska and his running mate Adlai Stevenson I of Illinois. This would prove to be the last occasion when the Republican presidential candidate won the Lauderdale and Limestone counties until Richard Nixon in 1972, the last when the Republican nominee carried the Butler and Walker counties until Barry Goldwater in 1964, and the last when the Democratic nominee carried Winston County until Franklin D. Roosevelt won it by one vote in 1932.

Results

Results by county

See also
United States presidential elections in Alabama

Notes

References

Alabama
1900
1900 Alabama elections